Mary Ellen O'Connell is the Robert and Marion Short Professor of Law at the University of Notre Dame Law School and a research professor of international dispute resolution at Notre Dame's Kroc Institute for International Peace in Studies.  Since joining the Notre Dame Law School in 2005, she has taught the courses International Law, International Law and the Use of Force, International Dispute Resolution, International Environmental Law, International Art Law, and Contracts.  Prior to joining Notre Dame's faculty, she taught at Ohio State University (1999–2005), as the William B. Saxbe Designated Professor of Law in the Moritz College of Law and was a senior fellow of the Mershon Center for the Study of International Security and Public Policy.  She was also a visiting professor at the University of Cincinnati College of Law (1998–1999).

Additional experience 
O'Connell has also been an associate professor (Title X, Professional Military Educator) for the US-German George C. Marshall European Center for Security Studies in Garmnisch-Partenkirchen, Germany (1995–1998),  a visiting professor at the Bologna Center of Johns Hopkins University (1993–1998), a guest professor at the Ludwig-Maximilians-Universität in Munich, Germany (1993–1995), and an associate professor of law at the Indiana University School of Law in Bloomington, Indiana (1989–1995, on leave 1993–1995).  Prior to beginning her career in academia, she practiced law as an attorney associate with Covington & Burling in Washington, D.C. (1985–1988).

Education 
Her educational background includes a Ph.D. by publication and an LL.B. (1st class honours) from Cambridge University,; a J.D. (multiple honors) from the Columbia University School of Law; an M.Sc. in International Relations from the London School of Economics after she was awarded the Marshall Scholarship,; and a B.A. (summa cum laude, Phi Beta Kappa, History Honors) from Northwestern University.

Special recognition 
Among her many grants, awards, and recognitions are a British Marshall Scholarship, a German Humboldt Foundation Fellowship, a Lauterpacht Research Centre for International Law (Cambridge)/MacArthur Foundation Fellowship, a U.S. Army Certificate of Achievement, funding from the Mershon Center (OSU) and the Kroc Institute (ND) for an international/inter-disciplinary conference "What is War?"  In 2015, she was presented with the University of Notre Dame's Reinhold Niebuhr Award, which honors a person whose life and writing promote or exemplify the area of social justice.

Publications 
O'Connell's 77 major publications (books, articles, and chapters) include 12 books and casebooks. She also has another 23 lesser publications.  She has been interviewed in or on or published in 30 networks, newspapers, and magazines. They range from the BBC and NPR to the New York Times and the Wall Street Journal to the networks Al Jazeerah and ARD (Germany) to Wired and Rolling Stone magazines. In 2012, she was named the Notre Dame Media Legend. Her latest solo-authored book is The Art of Law in the International Community (Cambridge University Press, 2019).

Special appointment 
During the 2014–2015 academic year, O'Connell served as the Senior Templeton Foundation Legal Scholar at the Center of Theological Inquiry/Law and Public Affairs (Princeton). In 2018 she was appointed a Visiting Fulbright Fellow at the Norwegian Nobel Institute.

Professional associations 
O'Connell is a member of and former Vice President of the American Society of International Law, a fellow of the Center for Theological Inquiry (Princeton Theological Seminary), and a member of the German Society of International Law, the International Institute for Humanitarian Law (San Remo, Italy), the International Law Association, and the American Branch of the International Law Association.

Personal life
She is married to the decorated celebrity photographer and award-winning author Peter Bauer. They reside near the University of Notre Dame campus.

References

Living people
University of Notre Dame faculty
Notre Dame Law School faculty
Ohio State University faculty
Moritz College of Law faculty
Year of birth missing (living people)
People associated with Covington & Burling